Karn Vinod Sharma (born 23 October 1987) is an Indian cricketer. He lives in Meerut, Uttar Pradesh. He plays as an all-rounder for the Railways cricket team. He is a left-hand batsman and leg break bowler. He made his Twenty20 International debut against England in 2014. He made his One Day International debut for India against Sri Lanka on 13 November 2014. He made his Test debut against Australia in Adelaide on 9 December 2014.

Domestic career

He made his first-class debut in 2007/08 Ranji season at Karnail Singh Stadium against Jammu and Kashmir, where he played as a specialist batsman. He scored 120 off 232 balls with 17 boundaries as Railways cricket team won by innings and 88 runs.

In July 2018, he was named in the squad for India Green for the 2018–19 Duleep Trophy. He was the leading wicket-taker for Andhra in the 2018–19 Vijay Hazare Trophy, with twelve dismissals in eight matches.

International career

T20I Career
Karn Sharma made his T20I debut on 7 September 2014 against England.

ODI career
Karn Sharma made his ODI debut on 13 November 2014 against Sri Lanka. Sadly he had a terrible outing with the ball on debut and he didn't get a chance to bat for the team

Test career
Karn Sharma made his Test debut on 9 December 2014 against Australia within a month of his ODI debut. He picked up 4 Wickets in 2 innings and dismissed his IPL teammate David Warner twice in the match. However he managed to score only 8 runs from 2 innings.

Indian Premier League

He featured for Royal Challengers Bangalore in 2009.

He was signed up by the IPL franchise Sunrisers Hyderabad in 2013. In a line-up comprising Dale Steyn, Thisara Perera and Amit Mishra, young Sharma was the bowler the opposition batsmen were expected to target.

He responded with a mature performance. His performance against Kings XI Punjab early on in the tournament was ample proof of his potential, as he beat the Kings XI batsmen with his spin.

He fortified an already strong bowling attack with a decent economy rate and was a good foil to Amit Mishra, the senior legspinner in the side. When he was given the chance also contributed with the bat scoring a stubborn unbeaten 39 when Sunrisers Hyderabad was staring at their first home defeat against Chennai Super Kings.

In 2014 IPL auctions, he was bought by Sunrisers Hyderabad for Rs 3.75 crore, in a bidding war with Kings XI Punjab. He was the highest paid uncapped Indian player in IPL 2014.

In 2015, he was retained by the Sunrisers Hyderabad and he plays as the lead spin bowler for the team. After being retained in the team for the 2016 season, he won the 2016 Indian Premier League with Sunrisers Hyderabad.

In February 2017, he was bought by the Mumbai Indians team for the 2017 Indian Premier League for 3.2 crores. He won the 2017 Indian Premier League with Mumbai Indians, he bowled a valuable spell by giving away only 18 runs in 4 overs in the final, he also bowled 12 dot balls in the match.

In January 2018, he was bought by the Chennai Super Kings for ₹5 crores in the 2018 IPL auction and subsequently went on to win the title that year and held the unique record for winning IPL title three years in row with 3 different teams. In February 2022, he was bought by the Royal Challengers Bangalore in the auction for the 2022 Indian Premier League tournament.

References

External links

 Karn Sharma - Cricinfo
 Karn Sharma's profile page on Wisden

Indian cricketers
Living people
1987 births
Sportspeople from Meerut
Railways cricketers
Royal Challengers Bangalore cricketers
Chennai Super Kings cricketers
Sunrisers Hyderabad cricketers
India One Day International cricketers
India Twenty20 International cricketers
India Test cricketers
India Green cricketers
India Red cricketers